The Museums of the Far East is a complex of three museums in Laeken, City of Brussels, Belgium, dedicated to Oriental art and culture, specifically that of China and Japan. Consisting of the Chinese Pavilion, the Japanese Tower and the Museum of Japanese Art, it forms part of the Royal Museums of Art and History (RMAH).

The buildings were designed by the architect Alexandre Marcel at the beginning of the 20th century on behalf of King Leopold II. The three museums have been closed since 2013 because of structural weaknesses. Some items from their collections are on public display at the Art & History Museum at the Parc du Cinquantenaire/Jubelpark of Brussels. The Chinese Pavilion and Japanese Tower were designated historic monuments in 2019.

The museum complex is situated the Mutsaard district, near to the Royal Palace of Laeken, the official residence of the King of the Belgians. This site is served by Stuyvenbergh metro station on line 6 of the Brussels Metro.

History
The idea for an outdoor display of oriental buildings, open to the public on the site, originated with King Leopold II, who had been particularly impressed by the Panorama du Tour du Monde at the Paris Exposition of 1900. The French architect Alexandre Marcel was commissioned in 1901 to build a Japanese pagoda (known as a Tō). It was inaugurated in 1905.

Work on a larger Chinese Pavilion began in 1905. The building was originally intended to be a restaurant, but never served the purpose for which it was intended. In 1909, with the death of Leopold II, the original plan for a museum was abandoned and the building was donated to the Belgian state where it served as part of the Trade Museum of the Ministry of Foreign Affairs. From 1947 until 1989, the whole area was closed to visitors. The museums' section on Japanese art is housed in a building near the Chinese Pavilion, originally intended to serve as a stable and garage for the complex.

The Chinese Pavilion and Japanese Tower were recognised as protected monuments in 2019. After closing to the public in 2013 for structural reasons, the complex was restored but not reopened to the public. The Flemish public broadcaster VRT reported in 2022 that the Federal Government had decided the previous year not to re-open the complex although no formal announcement had been made to this effect.

Exhibits
The Museums of the Far East collectively refers to three separate museums situated close to each other which can be accessed on the same ticket. They are:
 The Chinese Pavilion
 The Japanese Tower
 The Museum of Japanese Art

One of the principal focuses of the museums' collection, Chinese porcelain and other chinoiserie, is housed in the Chinese Pavilion. The Pavilion's displays focus on Chinese art originally designed for export to the West. The Chinese Pavilion is situated in a Chinese garden.

The Japanese Tower displays Japanese art, mostly porcelain created for export to the West. It is situated within a replica Japanese garden. The Museum of Japanese Art contains the bulk of the museums' collection of Japanese art and displays several suits of samurai armour, netsuke and decorative sword hilts, as well as woodblock prints and other artifacts. It is situated in the complex's carriage house and has only recently opened to the public.

Temporary exhibitions are also regularly held at the museum. Further examples of Asian art are also held by the RMAH at the Art & History Museum at the Parc du Cinquantenaire/Jubelpark in Brussels.

Gallery

See also

 History of Brussels
 Culture of Belgium
 Belgium in "the long nineteenth century"
 Japanese Garden of Hasselt

References

Notes

External links

 Museums of the Far East at the Official Website of the Brussels Region

Museums in Brussels
Art museums and galleries in Belgium
Asian art museums in Belgium